The Russia men's national under-16 and under-17 basketball team is a national basketball team of Russia, administered by the Russian Basketball Federation. It represented the country in men's international under-16 and under-17 basketball competitions.

After the 2022 Russian invasion of Ukraine, FIBA banned Russian teams and officials from participating in FIBA basketball competitions.

FIBA U16 European Championship participations

See also
Russia men's national basketball team
Russia men's national under-19 basketball team
Soviet Union men's national under-16 basketball team
Russia women's national under-17 basketball team

References

External links
Archived records of Russia team participations

Basketball in Russia
u17
Basketball
Men's national under-17 basketball teams